The 1931 Washington Huskies football team was an American football team that represented the University of Washington during the 1931 college football season. In its second season under head coach Jimmy Phelan, the team compiled a 5–3–1 record, finished in fifth place in the Pacific Coast Conference, and outscored all opponents by a combined total of 166 to 83. Paul Schwegler was the team captain.

Schedule

References

Washington
Washington Huskies football seasons
Washington Huskies football